Awadh Al-Sameer (born 6 May 1961) is an Omani long-distance runner. He competed in the marathon at the 1984 Summer Olympics and the 1988 Summer Olympics.

References

External links
 

1961 births
Living people
Athletes (track and field) at the 1984 Summer Olympics
Athletes (track and field) at the 1988 Summer Olympics
Omani male long-distance runners
Omani male marathon runners
Olympic athletes of Oman
Place of birth missing (living people)